Larry Kristoff (born November 11, 1942) is an American wrestler. He competed at the 1964 Summer Olympics and the 1968 Summer Olympics.

References

1942 births
Living people
American male sport wrestlers
Olympic wrestlers of the United States
Wrestlers at the 1964 Summer Olympics
Wrestlers at the 1968 Summer Olympics
People from Carbondale, Illinois
Pan American Games medalists in wrestling
Pan American Games gold medalists for the United States
Wrestlers at the 1967 Pan American Games
20th-century American people
21st-century American people